Accumulation of lipofuscin
 Aging brain
 Calorie restriction
 Cross-link
 Crosslinking of DNA
 Degenerative disease
 DNA damage theory of aging
 Exposure to ultraviolet light
 Free-radical damage
 Glycation
 Life expectancy
 Longevity
 Maximum life span
 Senescence
 Stem cell theory of aging

See also
 Index of topics related to life extension

Aging processes